Tankōbon volume 61 to 80 encapsulates all the chapters 631 to 850.



Volume list

References
General

Specific

Case Closed volumes (61-current)

zh:名侦探柯南漫画列表